Sardo is a hard, grating cow's milk cheese that is similar to Pecorino Romano.

Sardo may also refer to:

Places
Bari Sardo, municipality in the Province of Nuoro in the Italian region Sardinia
Meana Sardo, municipality in the Province of Nuoro in the Italian region Sardinia
Riola Sardo, municipality in the Province of Oristano in the Italian region Sardinia

Other uses
Italian for Sardinian language (Sardinian Sardu, Italian Sardo) with its two main orthographies: 
Logudorese dialect (Sardu logudoresu) 
Campidanese dialect (Sardu campidanesu)
Gennaro Sardo (born 1979), Italian footballer 
Levriero Sardo, a breed of dog
Pecorino Sardo, firm cheese from the Italian island of Sardinia which is made from sheep milk
Sardo, a character from the Canadian TV series Are You Afraid of the Dark?

See also
Sard (Carnelian), a brownish-red mineral
Sarda (disambiguation)
Sardi (disambiguation)
Sardu (disambiguation)